Hala Khorshid was an Iranian morning TV program produced and performed by Reza Rashidpour with a social background and an active, lively and attractive atmosphere, which was broadcast from Saturday to Thursday on IRIB TV3.

Hala Khorshid included various sections such as: reviewing the country's daily newspapers, talking to guests, yellow lights, idea exchange, underground, billboard and…

Program sections 
 Newspapers: Review of the country's daily newspapers and read important headlines and information
 Guest: Invite a guest related to the topic of the program and talk to him
 Yellow light: Review of marginal news and follow up on relevant issues from relevant officials and officials
 Idea Exchange: Get different ideas and find an investor
 Billboard: Introducing newsmakers in the last 24 hours
 Curriculum vitae: Examining the curriculum vitae of political and social figures and giving people a grade
 Counter and news: 5 minutes of newspaper reading and jokes with the hot news of the day
 Sports: Analysis of sports topics and events with the presence of sports journalist: Ali Aali
 Chi Chi Sho: In this section, a photo is displayed in the program and the virtual space of the program, and viewers are asked to write a comment in accordance with the subject of the photo and share it on the page of this program.  The best comments will be read in the next program.
 Underground: A joke with old photos and videos performed by Hamid Parsa

Program margins 
 The presence of Mohammad Hosseinopour with the title of Dr. Sayan in April 2016 in the program Hala Khorshid, as the creator of a sports style and the author of a large encyclopedia who claimed to be Muhammad al-Mahdi shortly after his presence.
 The presence of Hossein Ataei, a 10-year-old car designer who claimed to have been invited to work with Tesla and Volvo and has several inventions, all of which were eventually denied.

References

External links 
 Hala Khorshid - IRIB TV3

Iranian television shows